Wojciechowice may refer to the following places in Poland:
Wojciechowice, Lower Silesian Voivodeship (south-west Poland)
Wojciechowice, Jędrzejów County in Świętokrzyskie Voivodeship (south-central Poland)
Wojciechowice, Opatów County in Świętokrzyskie Voivodeship (south-central Poland)
Wojciechowice, Ostrowiec County in Świętokrzyskie Voivodeship (south-central Poland)
Wojciechowice, Masovian Voivodeship (east-central Poland)